Sergio Rodríguez López-Ros (born 21 November 1970) is a Spanish academic and diplomat. He serves as the current Pro-Rector of the Universitat Abat Oliba CEU of Barcelona.

Education 
Rodríguez was born in Barcelona to a Portuguese family that had settled in Spain since the 18th century. He was educated at the Salesian College of Sarrià, before graduating in Communication at the Autonomous University of Barcelona and taking a specialized course at the Menéndez Pelayo International University.

After a doctoral course with Professor Román Gubern, he achieved a PhD  at the Ramon Llull University, with a doctoral court chaired by Artur Juncosa Carbonell, on the Philosophical approach to the identity of people of gypsy culture. Finally he specialized in the London School of Economics and the Massachusetts Institute of Technology.

Rodriguez performed military service in the Spanish Arapiles Regiment (twinned with the British Royal Lancers) and in the Major State of the IV Military Region. He received the Distinguished Service Diploma. Later made an internship in the organizing committee for the 1992 Summer Olympics.

Career 
In the Spanish Foreign Service, Rodriguez served in the Spanish embassies to Italy, San Marino, Albania and Malta, as well as director of two centres of the Instituto Cervantes (temporary coordinator of another), and in the Spanish Consulate General in Milano. He also served as a coordinator of the House for a City of Knowledge within the City Council of Barcelona.

Rodriguez has been a consultant of the EU bodies EACEA, TAIEX and REA, as well as a member of researches for the European Council and the European Parliament. He participated in one of the feasibility reports of the FRA and in the forums of the Holy See, the EPSC, the Aspen Institute, the COMECE, the Club of Rome and the OMAEC (World Organisation of Former Pupils of Catholic Education).

Rodríguez was the architect of the bilateral agreements on the Instituto Cervantes between the Kingdom of Spain and the Holy See, Italy, San Marino and the Sovereign Order of Malta, as well as the opening of a Spanish centre in Albania. In 2000, Rodriguez aided in the search of Roma people in Spain to be compensated by the Swiss Banking Council for having been forcibly employed by companies during Nazism, and also in the protection of Roma families from Kosovo who had taken refuge on the Greek border. He also contributed to the transfer from Spain to the Netherlands of the Command Baton of William I of Orange

He is currently ambassador-consultant of the Fundação Rei Afonso Henriques of public cooperation Spain–Portugal and a member of the Advisory Council on International of Foment Nacional del Treball (CEOE), the Advisory Council of the Fundación Pere Closa, the Xarxa Vives d'Universitats and the Scientific Committee of the public magazine Mediterráneo.

Rodriguez is considered an expert on cultural diplomacy, corporate diplomacy, multilateral processes, Mediterranean issues, ethics and artificial intelligence, business ethics, traceability, governance, transparency and sustainability.

Other activities 
Rodriguez has participated in research, both in public and private universities around Europe, which primarily study intercultural and interfaith dialogue, among those in the GRIC (Groupe de Recherche Islamo-Chretien, settled in Paris). He has been involved in the design of policies that are inclusive towards minorities in the European Union and encourage the involvement of minorities in European society. He is a foremost expert on the Roma people in Europe.

An Author of several essays and history books (the last one entries for the dictionary "Vislumbres", 2021, edited by the Spanish Foreign Office), he is correspondent fellow of the Royal Academy of History (Spain) and also of the Academy of Sciences of Bologna (Italy). He has been distinguished with some public decorations, both national and international, among others the rarely conceded Order of the Social Solidarity awarded by H.M. King Felipe VI of Spain.

He regularly writes articles on geopolitics and geoeconomics in the La Vanguardia and The Diplomat.

Personal life 
Rodriguez has one son. Their traditional family seat is in Alcañices, in the county of Aliste, closed to the Portuguese border, once abandoned the previous one in the county of the Castle of Algoso in the 18th century.

Among his ancestors can be found Pablo Muñoz de la Morena, Tomás Pellicer, Roque López or José Rodríguez, who was declared two times Meritorious of the Homeland (1860 and 1876) by the Spanish Parliament.

One of his direct relatives is the TV illusionist Miguel de Lucas of La 2 (Spanish TV channel). Other current ones are Rodrigo Martins, Mayor of Miranda do Douro and Toninho Munhoz, Mayor of Alfenas.

He has taken dressage lessons with Rafael Soto.

Decorations 
Apart from foreign honours, he has been distinguished with these Spanish decorations:
  Knight Commander with Star of the Order of the Solidarity
  Knight Official of the Order of Isabella the Catholic
  Knight Official of the Order of Civil Merit
  Cross with Star of the National Gendarmerie
  Cross of the Spanish Army
  Cross of the National Police
  Medal of the V Centenary of Saint Barbara

References

External links 
 Vittorio Sgarbi introduces in Rome the latest book by Sergio Rodríguez
 Found the tomb of the Catalan who could have been Pope in 1484
 RTVE - The Roma People in Europe
 Tour of the Spanish churches in Rome
 El País - Book Review: 'Gitanidad. Otra manera de ver el mundo'
 The director of Cervantes in Rome asks not to cut back on education and help young people
 "An institutional pact is needed for the teaching of Spanish"
 Sergio Rodríguez, uno degli elencati nel 25° Premio Internazionale "Rocca D’Oro" alla Professionalità
 The Embassy of Spain proposes 'Routes through Spanish culture in Christian Rome'
 The Embassy of Guatemala in the Italian Republic participates in the Ibero-American Film Festival of Rome
 Paraguayan Embassy reports on activities of the Minister-Secretary of Culture in Italy
 Great success of the round table on painter Menchu Gal, "color in cubism"

1970 births
Living people
Corresponding members of the Real Academia de la Historia
People from Barcelona
Spanish people of Portuguese descent